Aneurinibacillus sediminis is a Gram-positive, spore-forming, obligately aerobic, rod-shaped and motile bacterium from the genus of Aneurinibacillus which has been isolated from sediments of a lagoon.

References

Paenibacillaceae
Bacteria described in 2017